Pathirippala is a town in Palakkad district, Kerala, India, between Ottappalam and Palakkad on the Palakkad–Ponnani state highway SH 23.

Regions

Perur 
Perur is a small village contributing the west side of Pathiripala. Perur is best known for its agricultural pattern and contribution.

Pookattukunnu 
Pookattukunnu is a village in Pathiripala. The river Bharatha Puzha flows near Pookattukunnu. A large quantity of vegetables, coconut and other products are exported from here. Pookattukunnu is connected to Paarapallam, Kottakad and Athirkkadu by road. There are many cattle farmers and a cattle farm in Pookattukunnu. A large quantity of milk is also produced here.

Administration
Lekkidi-Perur, Mankara and Mannur Gram Panchayats constitute the town. It is famous for its recently revived weekly vegetable market. Pathiripala is a place which connects to Kongad. Pathiripala Higher Secondary School is situated near the junction itself. Pookkattukunnu, Nagripuram, Perur and Athirkkadu are nearby villages.

Access
The nearest major railway stations are Ottappalam ( away) and Palakkad Junction ( away). A number of government and private buses offer connectivity from Pathiripala to different cities and towns in Kerala. The nearest airports are Cochin International Airport, Calicut Airport and in neighbouring Tamil Nadu, the Coimbatore Airport.

Transportation
This village connects to other parts of India through Palakkad. National Highway No. 544 connects to Coimbatore and Bangalore. Other parts of Kerala are accessed through National Highway No. 66 going through Thrissur. Calicut International Airport, Cochin International Airport and Coimbatore Airport are the nearest airports. Shoranur Junction railway station is the nearest major railway station.

References

Cities and towns in Palakkad district

Sri, Kumaran Nair Sewa Sadanam located in athirkkad road.

The first football club 1996, Name: Brothers club Pathiripala and The second is Raibow spaorts Club.

Edited by Abu Murath - Arathodi House - 23-05-2021